In Your House 6 (retroactively titled In Your House 6: Rage in the Cage) was the sixth In Your House professional wrestling pay-per-view (PPV) event produced by the World Wrestling Federation (WWF, now WWE). The event took place on February 18, 1996, at the Louisville Gardens in Louisville, Kentucky. Five matches were broadcast on the pay-per-view. There were also three dark matches and one match taped for Free for All.

The main event of the show was a Steel Cage match, in which reigning WWF World Heavyweight Champion Bret Hart defended the championship against Diesel. With the launch of the WWE Network in 2014, this show became available on demand; however, it does not include the three dark matches held after the main show.

Production

Background
In Your House was a series of monthly pay-per-view (PPV) shows first produced by the World Wrestling Federation (WWF, now WWE) in May 1995. They aired when the promotion was not holding one of its then-five major PPVs (WrestleMania, King of the Ring, SummerSlam, Survivor Series, and Royal Rumble), and were sold at a lower cost. This sixth In Your House event took place on February 18, 1996, at the Louisville Gardens in Louisville, Kentucky. While this event was originally known simply as In Your House 6, it was later retroactively renamed as In Your House 6: Rage in the Cage. This retroactive renaming of the show was based on the main event being a steel cage match.

Storylines
The professional wrestling matches at In Your House 6 featured professional wrestlers performing as characters in scripted events pre-determined by the hosting promotion, World Wrestling Federation (WWF). Storylines between the characters played out on WWF's primary television programs, Monday Night Raw.

At the 1995 Survivor Series Bret Hart defeated Diesel to win the WWF World Heavyweight Championship. Diesel, who had been a face throughout his time as champion, began showing more and more heel tendencies both in his wrestling style and comments towards other wrestlers; at the 1996 Royal Rumble he attacked referee Earl Hebner during Hart's title match against The Undertaker, costing the latter his opportunity for the championship. After this, Bret Hart was scheduled to defend the championship against Diesel on In Your House 6. To prevent any outside interferences this match was placed inside a Steel cage.

In November 1995, 1-2-3 Kid turned on Razor Ramon and joined Ted Dibiase's heel Million Dollar Corporation. This would result in the two squaring off against each other in a tag team mach at In Your House 5, before their feud took a month-long lapse after Goldust pursued Ramon's Intercontinental Championship. At the 1996 Royal Rumble, the feud resumed after 1-2-3 Kid interfered in Ramon's match against Goldust and cost him the Intercontinental Championship. This would lead the two wrestling at the event in the first ever "Crybaby match," which involved a stipulation requiring that the winner force the loser to suck on a giant baby bottle and wear baby powder and a diaper. 

Another rivalry leading into the event was between Shawn Michaels and Owen Hart. In autumn 1995, Michaels took a hiatus from wrestling due to an injury sustained in a real-life attack. Michaels teased retirement but returned in January 1996 to win the 1996 Royal Rumble match, earning him a title opportunity at Wrestlemania XII. However, Owen Hart taunted Michaels, claiming credit for the injury, leading to a match at the event, in which Michaels put his title opportunity on the line.

Event 
During the main event Steel Cage match, The Undertaker emerged inside the steel cage by breaking through the ring mat and attacked Diesel, dragging him down through the hole to allow Bret Hart to climb over the top of the cage to win the match.

After the matches shown live on pay-per-view, three untelevised dark matches were contested at the venue.

Aftermath
As a result of his victory against Owen Hart, Shawn Michaels challenged Bret Hart for the WWF World Heavyweight Championship in the main event of WrestleMania XII in an Iron Man match. Michaels won the match and his first WWF World Heavyweight Championship. Bret Hart took a six-month hiatus from wrestling. Following the Undertaker's interference in the Steel Cage match, he wrestled and defeated Diesel at WrestleMania XII.

Results

Other on-screen personnel

References

External links 
 

06
1996 in Kentucky
1996 WWF pay-per-view events
Events in Louisville, Kentucky
February 1996 events in the United States
Professional wrestling in Kentucky